The Road-rail bridge of Pocinho, commonly known as Pocinho Bridge, is a road-rail bridge in Vila Nova de Foz Côa, Portugal. The structure was part of the now defunct rail network Sabor line, and is now closed to both types of transit.

Construction 

In the turn of the 19th century, the necessity of a new bridge above the Douro connecting the Estrada Real number 9 between the parishes of Pocinho and Miranda, in the Bragança District, arose. The two public tenders opened by the Portuguese Government in July 1901 and May 1902 were not successful, so the Government authorized its railway department, to negotiate the project with Empresa Industrial Portuguesa. Construction started in 1903 and the bridge was opened to the public on 4 July 1909. The upper board of the bridge was opened to exploration as part of the railway Sabor line on 1911.

Decline and closure 

The railway line was closed in 1988. In 2001, car traffic was closed in the lower board of the bridge due to the existence of an alternative to the crossing using the Pocinho Dam, close to the centenary bridge.

See also
List of bridges in Portugal

References

Sources

Bridges in Bragança District